The 2014 Guelph municipal election was held on October 27, 2014 in Guelph, Ontario, Canada, to elect the Mayor of Guelph, Guelph City Council, the Guelph members of the Upper Grand District School Board (Public) and Wellington Catholic District School Board, and the regional members of Conseil Scolaire de District Catholiques Centre-Sud and Conseil Scolaire Viamonde (Public). The election was held in conjunction with the provincewide 2014 municipal elections.

For the first time during this election, the City of Guelph used online voting during the advanced polling, in an attempt to boost voter turnout and increase accessibility options for voters.

Timeline
 January 2: Nomination period begins
 September 12: Nomination period ends
 October 7: Advanced Internet voting begins
 October 15: Advanced Ballot voting begins
 October 19: Advanced Ballot voting ends
 October 24: Advanced Internet voting ends
 October 27: Election Day

Election results

Names in bold denotes elected candidates. 
(X) denotes incumbent.

Mayor 
One candidate to be elected.

Opinion polls

Councillors
Two candidates per ward to be elected.

Ward 1

Ward 2

Ward 3

Ward 4

Ward 5

Ward 6

Incumbents Not Seeking Re-Election
 Lise Burcher (Ward 5)
 Ian Findlay (Ward 2)
 Jim Furfaro (Ward 1)
 Gloria Kovach (Ward 4)

Upper Grand District School Board

Wards 1 & 5
Two candidates to be elected.

Wards 2, 3, & 4
Two candidates to be elected.

Ward 6 and Puslinch
One candidate to be elected.

Wellington Catholic District School Board
Four candidates to be elected.

Conseil Scolaire de District Catholiques Centre-Sud
One candidate to be elected, representing Brampton, Caledon, Dufferin County and Wellington County.

Conseil Scolaire Viamonde
One candidate to be elected, representing Waterloo Region, Middlesex County, Wellington County, Perth County and Huron County.

References

Guelph
2014